The Scottish Public Pensions Agency is an executive agency of the Scottish Government. It is responsible for the administration and regulation of government pension schemes in Scotland. This includes the pension schemes of NHS Scotland and for Scotland's teachers.

The Agency is based in Tweedbank, in the Scottish Borders.

History

The Agency was formed as the Scottish Office Pension Agency on 1 April 1993. Following devolution, responsibility for the Agency transferred to the Scottish Executive, and it was renamed to its current title.

In 2001, the Agency was relocated from Edinburgh to the Scottish Borders.

Pension schemes

The Agency administers and regulates the following schemes:
 National Health Service Superannuation Scheme (Scotland) for NHS Scotland employees;
 Scottish Teachers’ Superannuation Scheme for teachers employed in Scottish schools;

In addition, it regulates the following schemes (administration is the responsibility of local managers):
 Local Government Pension Scheme 
 Firefighters' Pension Scheme 
 Police Pensions Scheme 
 Scottish Parliamentary Pension Scheme 
 The Legal Aid (Scotland) Pension Scheme 
 Scottish Executive Rural Affairs Department Superannuation Scheme
 Scottish Transport Group Pension Schemes

References

External links
 Scottish Public Pensions Agency

Public Pensions
Government agencies established in 1993
Public pension funds in the United Kingdom
1993 establishments in Scotland
Organisations based in the Scottish Borders
NHS Scotland
Education in Scotland
Local government in Scotland
Law enforcement in Scotland
Scottish Parliament
Pension regulation